Horlick may refer to:

Harry Horlick (1896–1970), American violinist and orchestra leader
Horlick Baronets, of Cowley Manor in the County of Gloucester, a title in the Baronetage of the United Kingdom
James Horlick (disambiguation) 
John Horlick (disambiguation) 
John Van Horlick (born 1949), a former World Hockey Association player for the Toronto Toros
Nicola Horlick, (born 1960), a British investment fund manager
Ted Horlick (1925–2021), a British naval officer
William Horlick (1846–1936), an English-born food manufacturer and the original patent holder of malted milk
Malted milk

See also
Horlicks, a malted drink from GlaxoSmithKline
Horlick Field, an 8,500 seat football stadium and a baseball park on the north side of Racine, Wisconsin, in the United States
Horlick Ice Stream, a large Antarctic ice stream on the featureless ice surface to the north of the main mass of the Horlick Mountains
Horlick Mountains, a mountain range in the Transantarctic Mountains of Antarctica, lying eastward of Reedy Glacier
William Horlick High School, a comprehensive public four-year high school in Racine, Wisconsin with an enrollment of approximately 2,200 students

de:Horlick